Events from the year 1786 in Sweden

Incumbents
 Monarch – Gustav III

Events
 5 April - The Royal Swedish Academy is founded. 
 1 May – King Gustav III summon the Riksdag of the Estates to Stockholm. 
 23 June - The Riksdag of the Estates is dissolved.
23 October - Charter rights are given to Östersund.
 Date unknown- The first school to give higher education to female students, the Societetsskolan, is founded in Gothenburg.
Date unknown - Foundation of the Swedish West India Company
Date unknown - Maria Christina Bruhn becomes the first woman to be given a patent as an inventor in Sweden.
Date unknown - The first hot air balloons are released in Sweden by the popular acrobat Antonio Bartolomeo Spinacuta.

Births
 19 January – Carl Gustaf Kröningssvärd,  lawyer and historian  (died 1859)
 13 May - Anna Ehrenström, poet (died 1857)
 8 August - Bengt Erland Fogelberg, sculptor (died 1854)
 18 September – Leonhard Fredrik Rääf, folklorist, local historian and conservative politician (died 1872)
 Helena Charlotta Åkerhielm, dramatist and translator (died 1828)

Deaths
 18 March – Gustaf Lundberg, painter (born 1695)
 11 May - Anna Sofia Ramström, courtier (born 1738)
 15 May - Eva Ekeblad, scientist (born 1724)
 21 May – Carl Wilhelm Scheele,  pharmaceutical chemist (born 1745)
 22 May – Carl Fredrik Mennander, bishop (born 1712)

References

 
Years of the 18th century in Sweden